is a passenger railway station in located in the city of  Hirakata, Osaka Prefecture, Japan, operated by the private railway company Keihan Electric Railway.

Lines
Murano Station is a station of the Keihan Katano Line, and is located 2.5 kilometers from the terminus of the line at Hirakatashi Station.

Station layout
The station has two ground-level opposed side platforms connected by an elevated station building.

Platforms

Adjacent stations

History
The station was opened on July 10, 1929.

Passenger statistics
In fiscal 2019, the station was used by an average of 4,840 passengers daily.

Surrounding area
Murano Public Housing
Murano Shrine
Murano Water Purification Plant 
Osaka Prefectural Hirakata Support School

See also
List of railway stations in Japan

References

External links

Official home page 

Railway stations in Osaka Prefecture
Railway stations in Japan opened in 1929
Hirakata, Osaka